The following is a list of state highways in Kentucky with numbers between 1 and 999.

1–99
 KY 1- from KY 3 near Fallsburg to US 23 in Greenup
 KY 2- from US 60 in Olive Hill to KY 2541 in Greenup
 KY 3- from US 23 / US 460 / KY 1100 near Auxier to US 23 near Catlettsburg (established 1929)
 KY 4- from KY 80 in Belcher to Virginia State Line (removed 1947 and replaced by US 460)
 KY 4- Complete loop in Lexington (established 1966)
 KY 5- from US 60 in Princess to US 23 near Bellefonte
 KY 6- from KY 26 in Woodbine to KY 11 / KY 459 in Barbourville
 KY 7- from KY 15 in Jeff to East First Ave in South Shore (established 1929)
 KY 8- from KY 237 near Taylorsport to US 62 in Maysville. KY 57 / KY 3550 in Concord to US 23 at South Portsmouth
 KY 9- from KY 1 / KY 7 near Grayson to KY 8 in Newport (established 1929)
 KY 10- from KY 915 near Alexandria to SR 253 near Franklin Furnace, OH (established 1929)
 KY 11- from KY 92 near Williamsburg to US 62 / KY 10 in Maysville (established 1929)
 KY 12- from Mt. Olivet to Maysville (removed 1930 and replaced by US 62)
 KY 12- from KY 43 near Shelbyville to the Franklin-Henry County line
 KY 13- from Bourbon-Nicholas County line to KY 36 in Carlisle
 KY 14- from US 42 / US 127 near Verona to KY 177 in Morning View (established 1929)
 KY 15- from US 119 in Whitesburg to US 60 in Winchester (established 1929)
 KY 16- from US 127 in Glencoe to KY 17 in Covington (established 1929)
 KY 17- from US 27 near Falmouth to Theodore M. Berry Way in Cincinnati, OH (established 1929)
 KY 18- from KY 338 near Rabbit Hash to KY 1017 in Florence
 KY 19- from US 62 near Claysville to KY 8 in Augusta (established 1929)
 KY 20- from KY 18 near Belleview to KY 8 near Constance
 KY 21- from KY 52 near Paint Lick to the Madison-Jackson County line (established 1929)
 KY 22- from US 42 in Louisville to KY 10 near Powersville (established 1929)
 KY 24- from US 62 in Sardis to KY 2 in Carter (removed 1974 and split into three and renumbered KY 324, KY 344, and KY 474 to avoid duplication with I-24) 
 KY 26- from US 25W near Williamsburg to US 25W in Corbin
 KY 28- from KY 11 / KY 30 in Booneville to KY 15 near Hazard
 KY 29- from Lock Seven Road in High Bridge to US 27 Bus. / KY 39 in Nicholasville (established 1929)
 KY 30- from Hal Rogers Parkway / KY 354 in London to US 460 / KY 7 near Salyersville
 KY 32- from US 62 / US 460 in Georgetown to KY 3 in Louisa (established 1929)
 KY 33- from US 127 / US 150 / KY 34 / KY 52 in Danville to US 62 in Versailles (established 1929)
 KY 34- from US 68 / KY 52 near Gravel Switchto Old US 27 near Bryantsville (established 1929)
 KY 35- from US 127 near Sparta to US 42 in Warsaw (established 1929)
 KY 36- from US 421 in Milton to US 460 in Frenchburg
 KY 37- from Ohio state line to US 60 in Frankfort (established 1929 and removed 1950. Became part of US 421)
 KY 37- from KY 243 near Gravel Switch to US 127 Byp. / US 150 Byp. in Danville (established 1950 and renumbered from KY 421)
 KY 38- from US 421 in Harlan to SR 624 near Keokee, VA
 KY 39- from KY 1247 in Somerset to KY 563 near Kentucky River (no crossing) and Kentucky River (no crossing) to US 27 Bus. / KY 29 in Nicholasville (established 1929)
 KY 40- from US 460 / KY 7 in Salyersville to Kermit, WV (established 1929)
 KY 43- from US 421 near Pleasureville to KY 55 Bus. / KY 2268 near Shelbyville
 KY 44- from US 31W / US 60 north of West Point to US 62 / US 127 in Lawrenceburg
 KY 46- from KY 52 near Nelsonville to KY 49 near Greenbrier
 KY 47- from KY 36 / KY 467 in Sanders to US 42 in Ghent
 KY 48- from US 31E / US 150 in Highgrove to US 62 / KY 55 in Bloomfield
 KY 49- from US 150 in Bardstown to KY 70 in Liberty
 KY 50- from US 51 in Bardwell to US 60 in Lexington (established 1929 and removed 1950. Bardwell to Frankfort became part of US 62 in 1930; rest became part of US 421)
 KY 50- from KY 512 west of Alton Station to KY 395 west of Alton Station (established 1950 and removed 1955. Became part of KY 512 (old route of KY 512 is now Benson Creek Road)
 KY 50- from US 60 west of Lexington to I-75 east of Lexington (established 1970 and removed 1980. Originally went east to US 60; this section was renumbered KY 1425
 KY 52- from US 62 in Boston to KY 30 near Jackson
 KY 53- from KY 555 near Willisburg to US 42 in Oldham County
 KY 54- from KY 2831 in Owensboro to US 62 in Leitchfield
 KY 55- from US 127 in Freedom to US 42 / KY 36 in Prestonville
 KY 56- from IL 13 near Old Shawneetown, IL to KY 81 near Owensboro
 KY 57- from KY 4 in Lexington to KY 8 in Concord
 KY 58- from Dead end near Columbus to US 68 near Briensburg
 KY 59- from KY 2 near Olive Hill to KY 8 in Vanceburg
 KY 61- from SR 53 near Peytonsburg to US 31E / US 60 in Louisville
 KY 63- from US 31E Bus. in Glasgow to SR 56 south of Gamaliel
 KY 64- from US 60 east of Cloverport to US 31W in Radcliff (removed 1962 and became part of KY 144 to avoid duplication with I-64)
 KY 65- from US 60 in Harned to US 68 in Hays (removed 1962 and became part of KY 259 to avoid duplication with I-65; northern portion now part of KY 79)
 KY 66- from US 119 in Hyden to the Virginia border (removed 1950 and became part of US 421)
 KY 66- from KY 11 near Oneida to US 25E in Pineville (established 1950 and the former portion of KY 21 that was renumbered because of US 421)
 KY 67- from KY 185 (at current junction with KY 1749) to US 68 in Bowling Green (established 1929 and removed 1969. Became part of KY 185)
 KY 67- from I-64 near Grayson to KY 3105 in Wurtland (established 2000)
 KY 69- from Bluff Lane near Central City to Indiana State Road 237 in Hawesville
 KY 70- from US 60 in Smithland to US 150 in Broahead
 KY 71- from US 60 in Owensboro to US 31E in Scottsville (established 1929 and removed 1952. Became part of US 231)
 KY 71- from KY 80 west of Bush to KY 229 north of Bailey Switch (established 1952 and removed 1962. Former KY 231; renumbered KY 1803 to avoid duplication with I-71)
 KY 72- from US 119 near Blackmont to Rockhouse Branch Rd near Alva and from Dead End near Pansy to KY 413 in Baxter
 KY 73- from US 31 in Horse Cave to the Tennessee border (established 1929 and removed 1931. Became part of US 31W)
 KY 73- from White Road near Franklin to KY 1038 north of Auburn (established 1931)
 KY 74- from SR 90 in Pruden tp US 25E in Middlesboro
 KY 75- from US 60 in Owensboro to the Tennessee state line (established 1929 and removed 1954. Became part of US 431)
 KY 75- from US 421 in McKee to KY 490 in Lamero (established 1954 and removed 1962. Became part of KY 89 to avoid duplication with I-75)
 KY 76- from KY 70 east of Campbellsville to a Dead End on Lake Cumberland
 KY 77- from KY 11 / KY 15 near Slade to US 460 southeast of Frenchburg
 KY 78- from KY 49 in rural Casey County to US 150 near Stanford
 KY 79- from US 31W & KY 100 in Franklin to the Tennessee border (removed 1944 and renumbered KY 383 when US 79 extended into Kentucky)
 KY 79- from US 431 in Russellville to SR 135 near Brandenburg (established 1966 as an extension of US 79; this road replaced part of KY 105, part of KY 108, and part of KY 448)
 KY 80- from KY 58 in Columbus to SR 80 east of Elkhorn City
 KY 81- from US 431 in South Carrollton to KY 54 / KY 2831 in Owensboro
 KY 82- from US 23 in Pikeville to the West Virginia border in Williamson (established 1929 and removed 1934. Became part of US 119)
 KY 82- from KY 89 southwest of Clay City to KY 15 in Clay City (established 1934)
 KY 83- from KY 55 south of Lockport to Carrollton (removed 1945 and renumbered KY 389)
 KY 83- from KY 303 / KY 2422 near Cuba to KY 94 near Lynnville (established 1945)
 KY 84- from KY 401 near Hudson to KY 49 / KY 52 in Lebanon
 KY 85- from KY 70 near Madisonville to US 62 near Rockport
 KY 86- from KY 144 in Union Star to US 62 near Cecilia
 KY 87- from Akersville Road in Allen County to US 31E in Lucas (Section A)
 KY 87- from SR 261 near Gamaliel to KY 63 / KY 100 in Gamaliel (Section B)
 KY 88- from US 62 in Clarkson to KY 61 near Greensburg
 KY 89- from KY 490 near Livingston to KY 627 in Winchester
 KY 90- from I-65 / KY 70 in Cave City to US 25W northwest of Williamsburg
 KY 91- from US 68 / KY 80 in Hopkinsville to IL 1 near Cave-in-Rock, IL
 KY 92- from KY 55 in Joppa to the Jamestown Marina Resort (Section A)
 KY 92- from the Beaver Creek Resort to US 25E in Hosman (Section B)
 KY 93- from KY 139 / KY 276 in rural Lyon County to KY 810 / KY 819 near Eddyville and from KY 917 near Iuka to KY 453 in rural Livingston County
 KY 94- from SR 78 near Tyler to KY 80 near Aurora
 KY 95- from US 68 in Palma to Haddox Ferry Road in Calvert City
 KY 96- from KY 102 in Keysburg to US 431 in Russellville
 KY 97- from SR 69 south of Sedalia to KY 80 / KY 121 / KY 121 Bus. near Mayfield
 KY 98- from KY 123 near Columbus to US 68 in Aurora (removed 1954 and became part of KY 80)
 KY 98- from KY 100 in Scottsville to KY 100 near Fountain Run (established 1954)
 KY 99- from SR 10 south of Holland to KY 100 in Holland

100–199
 KY 100
 KY 101
 KY 102
 KY 103
 KY 104
 KY 105
 KY 106
 KY 107
 KY 108
 KY 109
 KY 110
 KY 111
 KY 112
 KY 113
 KY 114
 KY 115
 KY 116
 KY 117
 KY 118
 KY 120
 KY 121
 KY 122
 KY 123
 KY 124
 KY 125
 KY 126
 KY 127 (renumbered KY 239 in 1958 because of US 127, which replaced the old KY 239)
 KY 128
 KY 129
 KY 130
 KY 131
 KY 132
 KY 133
 KY 134
 KY 135
 KY 136
 KY 137
 KY 138
 KY 139
 KY 140
 KY 141
 KY 142
 KY 143
 KY 144
 KY 145
 KY 146
 KY 147
 KY 148
 KY 149
 KY 151
 KY 152
 KY 153
 KY 154
 KY 155
 KY 156
 KY 157
 KY 158
 KY 159
 KY 160
 KY 161
 KY 162
 KY 163
 KY 164
 KY 165
 KY 166
 KY 167
 KY 168
 KY 169
 KY 170
 KY 171
 KY 172
 KY 173
 KY 174
 KY 175
 KY 176
 KY 177
 KY 178
 KY 179
 KY 180
 KY 181
 KY 182
 KY 183
 KY 184
 KY 185
 KY 186
 KY 187
 KY 188
 KY 189
 KY 190
 KY 191
 KY 192
 KY 193
 KY 194
 KY 195
 KY 196
 KY 197
 KY 198
 KY 199

200–299
 KY 200
 KY 201
 KY 202
 KY 203
 KY 204
 KY 205
 KY 206
 KY 207
 KY 208
 KY 209
 KY 210
 KY 211
 KY 212
 KY 213
 KY 214
 KY 215
 KY 216
 KY 217
 KY 218
 KY 219
 KY 220
 KY 221
 KY 222
 KY 223
 KY 224
 KY 225
 KY 226
 KY 227
 KY 228
 KY 229
 KY 230
 KY 231 (renumbered KY 71 in 1952 because of US 231, which replaced the old KY 71; the new KY 71 was renumbered again to KY 1803 in 1957 because of I-71)
 KY 232
 KY 233
 KY 234
 KY 235
 KY 236
 KY 237
 KY 238
 KY 239 (former route became part of US 127 (along with the portion of KY 16 south of KY 239) in 1958)
 KY 240
 KY 241
 KY 242
 KY 243
 KY 244
 KY 245
 KY 246
 KY 247
 KY 248
 KY 249
 KY 250
 KY 251
 KY 252
 KY 253
 KY 254
 KY 255
 KY 256
 KY 257
 KY 258
 KY 259
 KY 260
 KY 261
 KY 262
 KY 263
 KY 264 (part became portions of KY 120, KY 283 (this portion now decommissioned), and KY 495 (this portion now part of KY 1835), and the rest was renumbered KY 1835 in 1962 to avoid conflict with the then-new I-264)
 KY 265 (renumbered KY 585 in 1988 to avoid conflict with the then-new I-265)
 KY 266
 KY 267
 KY 268
 KY 269
 KY 270
 KY 271
 KY 272
 KY 273
 KY 274
 KY 275 (became a portion of KY 317 in 1964 to avoid conflict with the then-new I-275)
 KY 276
 KY 277
 KY 278
 KY 279
 KY 280
 KY 281
 KY 282
 KY 283
 KY 284
 KY 285
 KY 286
 KY 287
 KY 288
 KY 289
 KY 290
 KY 291
 KY 292
 KY 293
 KY 294
 KY 295
 KY 296
 KY 297
 KY 298
 KY 299

300–399
 KY 300
 KY 301
 KY 302
 KY 303
 KY 304
 KY 305
 KY 306
 KY 307
 KY 308
 KY 309
 KY 310
 KY 311
 KY 312
 KY 313
 KY 314
 KY 315
 KY 316
 KY 317
 KY 318 (removed 1992)
 KY 319
 KY 320
 KY 321
 KY 322
 KY 323
 KY 324
 KY 325
 KY 326
 KY 327
 KY 328
 KY 329
 KY 330
 KY 331
 KY 332
 KY 333
 KY 334
 KY 335
 KY 336
 KY 337
 KY 338
 KY 339
 KY 340
 KY 341
 KY 342
 KY 343
 KY 344
 KY 345
 KY 346
 KY 347
 KY 348
 KY 349 (removed 1995)
 KY 350
 KY 351
 KY 352
 KY 353
 KY 354
 KY 355
 KY 356
 KY 357
 KY 358
 KY 359
 KY 360
 KY 361
 KY 362
 KY 363
 KY 364
 KY 365
 KY 366
 KY 367
 KY 368
 KY 369
 KY 370
 KY 371
 KY 372
 KY 373
 KY 374
 KY 375
 KY 376
 KY 377
 KY 378
 KY 379
 KY 380
 KY 381
 KY 382
 KY 383
 KY 384
 KY 385
 KY 386
 KY 387
 KY 388
 KY 389
 KY 390
 KY 391
 KY 392
 KY 393
 KY 394
 KY 395
 KY 396
 KY 397
 KY 398
 KY 399

400–499
 KY 400
 KY 401
 KY 402
 KY 403
 KY 404
 KY 405
 KY 406
 KY 407
 KY 408
 KY 409
 KY 410
 KY 411
 KY 412
 KY 413
 KY 414 (removed 2014)
 KY 415
 KY 416
 KY 417
 KY 418
 KY 419
 KY 420
 KY 421 (renumbered KY 37 in 1950 because of US 421, which replaced the old KY 37)
 KY 422
 KY 423
 KY 424
 KY 425
 KY 426
 KY 427
 KY 428
 KY 429
 KY 430
 KY 431 (renumbered KY 458 in 1954 because of US 431)
 KY 432
 KY 433
 KY 434
 KY 435
 KY 436
 KY 437
 KY 438
 KY 439
 KY 440
 KY 441
 KY 442
 KY 443
 KY 444
 KY 445
 KY 446
 KY 447
 KY 448
 KY 449
 KY 450
 KY 451
 KY 452
 KY 453
 KY 454
 KY 455
 KY 456
 KY 457
 KY 458 (created in 1954; former KY 431; old route was in Christian County)
 KY 459
 KY 461
 KY 462
 KY 463
 KY 464
 KY 465
 KY 466
 KY 467
 KY 468
 KY 469
 KY 470
 KY 471 (Extension of I-471; the original KY 471 was renumbered KY 1804 in 1962 to avoid conflict with then-new I-471)
 KY 472
 KY 473
 KY 474
 KY 475
 KY 476
 KY 477
 KY 478
 KY 479
 KY 480
 KY 481
 KY 482
 KY 483
 KY 484
 KY 485
 KY 486
 KY 487
 KY 488
 KY 489
 KY 490
 KY 491
 KY 492
 KY 493
 KY 494
 KY 495
 KY 496
 KY 497
 KY 498
 KY 499

500–599

 KY 500
 KY 501
 KY 502
 KY 503
 KY 504
 KY 505
 KY 506
 KY 507
 KY 508
 KY 509
 KY 510
 KY 511
 KY 512
 KY 513
 KY 514
 KY 515
 KY 516
 KY 517
 KY 518 (removed 2001)
 KY 519
 KY 520
 KY 521
 KY 522
 KY 523
 KY 524
 KY 525
 KY 526
 KY 527
 KY 528
 KY 529
 KY 530
 KY 531
 KY 532
 KY 533
 KY 534
 KY 535
 KY 536
 KY 537
 KY 538
 KY 539
 KY 540
 KY 541
 KY 542
 KY 543
 KY 544
 KY 545
 KY 546 (removed 1994)
 KY 547
 KY 548
 KY 549
 KY 550
 KY 551
 KY 552
 KY 553
 KY 554
 KY 555
 KY 556
 KY 557
 KY 558
 KY 559
 KY 560
 KY 561
 KY 562
 KY 563
 KY 564
 KY 565
 KY 566
 KY 567
 KY 568
 KY 569
 KY 570
 KY 571
 KY 572
 KY 573
 KY 574
 KY 575
 KY 576
 KY 577
 KY 578
 KY 579 (removed 1985)
 KY 580
 KY 581
 KY 582
 KY 583
 KY 584
 KY 585 (renumbered from 265 in 1988; previous routing was in Logan County and was removed in 1982)
 KY 586
 KY 587
 KY 588
 KY 589
 KY 590
 KY 591
 KY 592
 KY 593
 KY 594
 KY 595
 KY 596
 KY 597
 KY 598
 KY 599

600–699

 KY 600
 KY 601
 KY 602
 KY 603
 KY 604
 KY 605
 KY 606
 KY 607
 KY 608
 KY 609
 KY 610
 KY 611
 KY 612
 KY 613
 KY 614 (removed 1985)
 KY 615
 KY 616
 KY 617
 KY 618
 KY 619
 KY 620
 KY 621
 KY 622
 KY 623
 KY 624
 KY 625
 KY 626
 KY 627
 KY 628
 KY 629
 KY 630
 KY 631
 KY 632
 KY 633
 KY 634
 KY 635
 KY 636
 KY 637 (removed between 1979 and 1981)
 KY 638
 KY 639
 KY 640
 KY 641 (renumbered KY 489 in 1955 because of US 641, which replaced the old KY 489)
 KY 642 (removed 1997)
 KY 643
 KY 644
 KY 645
 KY 646
 KY 647 (removed 1997)
 KY 648
 KY 649
 KY 650
 KY 651
 KY 652
 KY 653
 KY 654
 KY 655
 KY 656
 KY 657
 KY 658
 KY 659
 KY 660
 KY 661
 KY 662
 KY 663
 KY 664
 KY 665
 KY 666
 KY 667
 KY 668
 KY 669
 KY 670
 KY 671
 KY 672
 KY 673 (removed by 1980)
 KY 674
 KY 675 (removed by 1980)
 KY 676
 KY 677
 KY 678
 KY 679
 KY 680
 KY 681
 KY 682
 KY 683 (removed 1993)
 KY 684 (removed 1993)
 KY 685
 KY 686
 KY 687
 KY 688 (removed 2002)
 KY 689
 KY 690
 KY 691
 KY 692
 KY 693
 KY 694 (removed 1994)
 KY 695
 KY 696
 KY 697
 KY 698
 KY 699

700–799

 KY 700
 KY 701
 KY 702
 KY 703
 KY 704
 KY 705
 KY 706
 KY 707
 KY 708
 KY 709
 KY 710
 KY 711
 KY 712
 KY 713
 KY 714
 KY 715
 KY 716
 KY 717
 KY 718
 KY 719
 KY 720
 KY 721
 KY 722
 KY 723
 KY 724
 KY 725
 KY 726
 KY 727
 KY 728
 KY 729
 KY 730
 KY 731
 KY 732
 KY 733
 KY 734
 KY 735
 KY 736
 KY 737
 KY 738
 KY 739
 KY 740
 KY 741
 KY 742
 KY 743
 KY 744
 KY 745
 KY 746
 KY 747 (removed by 1980)
 KY 748
 KY 749
 KY 750
 KY 751
 KY 752
 KY 753
 KY 754
 KY 755
 KY 756
 KY 757
 KY 758
 KY 759 (removed 1986)
 KY 760
 KY 761
 KY 762
 KY 763
 KY 764
 KY 765
 KY 766
 KY 767
 KY 768
 KY 769
 KY 770
 KY 771
 KY 772
 KY 773
 KY 774
 KY 775
 KY 776
 KY 777
 KY 778
 KY 779
 KY 780
 KY 781
 KY 782
 KY 783
 KY 784
 KY 785
 KY 786
 KY 787
 KY 788 - from U.S. Route 41A to Fort Campbell
 KY 789
 KY 790
 KY 791
 KY 792
 KY 793
 KY 794
 KY 795
 KY 796
 KY 797
 KY 798
 KY 799

800–899

 KY 800 
 KY 801 
 KY 802 
 KY 803 
 KY 804 
 KY 805 
 KY 806 
 KY 807 
 KY 808 
KY 809 (removed 1983)
 KY 810
 KY 811 
 KY 812
 KY 813 
 KY 814 
 KY 815 
 KY 816 
 KY 817- created 1993 in Casey County and removed from Trigg County in 1983)
 KY 818 
 KY 819 
 KY 820 
 KY 821 
 KY 822 
 KY 823 
 KY 824 
 KY 825 
 KY 826 
 KY 827 
 KY 828 
 KY 829 
 KY 830 
 KY 831 
 KY 832 
 KY 833 
 KY 834 
 KY 835 (removed 1994)
 KY 836 
 KY 837 
 KY 838 
 KY 839 
 KY 840 
 KY 841 
 KY 842-created in 1987 and removed from Anderson County by 1980)
 KY 843 (removed by 1980)
 KY 844 
 KY 845 
 KY 846 
 KY 847 
 KY 848 
 KY 849 
 KY 850 
 KY 851 
 KY 852 (removed by 1980)
 KY 853
 KY 854 
 KY 855 
 KY 856 
 KY 857 
 KY 858 
 KY 859 
 KY 860 
 KY 861 
 KY 862 
 KY 863 
 KY 864 
 KY 865 
 KY 866 
 KY 867 
 KY 868 
 KY 869 
 KY 870 
 KY 871 
 KY 872 (removed by 1982)
 KY 873 
 KY 873 
 KY 874 
 KY 875 
 KY 876 
 KY 877 
 KY 878 
 KY 879 
 KY 880 
 KY 881 
 KY 882 
 KY 883 
 KY 884 
 KY 885
 KY 886 
 KY 887 
 KY 888 
 KY 889 
 KY 890 
 KY 891 
 KY 892 
 KY 893
 KY 894 (removed 1993)
 KY 895
 KY 896 
 KY 897 (removed 2012)
 KY 898 
 KY 899

900–999
 KY 900 
 KY 901 
 KY 902 
 KY 903 
 KY 904 
 KY 905 
 KY 906 
 KY 907 
 KY 908 
 KY 909 
 KY 910 
 KY 911 
 KY 912 
 KY 913 
 KY 913C 
 KY 914- created in 1995 in Pulaski County and removed in Marshall County in 1981)
 KY 915- create in Campbell County in 1994 and removed in Logan County in 1989
 KY 916 
 KY 917 
 KY 918 
 KY 919
 KY 920 
 KY 921 
 KY 922 
 KY 923 
 KY 924 
 KY 925 
 KY 926 
 KY 927 
 KY 928 
 KY 929 
 KY 930 
 KY 931 
 KY 932 
 KY 933 
 KY 934 
 KY 935 
 KY 936 
 KY 937 
 KY 938 
 KY 939 (removed 2005)
 KY 940 
 KY 941 
KY 942 (removed 1988)
 KY 943 
 KY 944 
 KY 945 
 KY 946 
 KY 947 
 KY 948 
 KY 949 
 KY 950 
 KY 951 
 KY 952 
 KY 953 
 KY 954 
 KY 955 
 KY 956- created in Madison County in 2008 and removed in Jefferson County in 1995. Removed in Bourbon and Fayette by 1976
 KY 957 
 KY 958 
 KY 959 
 KY 960 
 KY 961 
 KY 962 
 KY 963 (removed 1997)
 KY 964 (removed 2000)
 KY 965 
 KY 966 
 KY 967 
 KY 968 
 KY 969 
 KY 970 
 KY 971 
 KY 972 
 KY 973 
 KY 974 
 KY 975 
 KY 976 
 KY 977 
 KY 978 (removed 2011)
 KY 979 
 KY 980- created in 1988 in Allen County and removed from Logan County in 1982
 KY 981 
 KY 982 
 KY 983 
 KY 984 
 KY 985 
 KY 986 
 KY 987 
 KY 988 
 KY 989 
 KY 990 
 KY 991 
 KY 992 
 KY 993 
 KY 994 
 KY 995 
 KY 996 
 KY 997 
 KY 998 
 KY 999

See also
 List of primary state highways in Kentucky

External links
 Kentucky Transportation Cabinet - Division of Planning

 0001
State0001